Velumbrella is a medusoid organism with tentacles known from the Middle Cambrian of Poland, and perhaps related to Rotadiscus; the fossils depict a scleritosed disk with a U-shaped gut.  It was originally related to members of the Ediacara biota but is now thought to be related to the paropsonemids.

References

Cambrian invertebrates
Prehistoric animal genera
Fossils of Poland